Elias of Alexandria may refer to:

 Elias (Greek scholar), fl. 6th century, Neoplatonist philosopher
 Patriarch Elias I of Alexandria, Greek Patriarch of Alexandria in 963–1000
 Patriarch Elias II of Alexandria, Greek Patriarch of Alexandria in 1171–1175